Cyperus croceus is a species of sedge that is native to tropical and sub-tropical parts of Asia and Australia.

The species was first formally described by the botanist Martin Vahl in 1805.

See also 
 List of Cyperus species

References 

diffusus
Taxa named by Martin Vahl
Plants described in 1805
Flora of Queensland
Flora of India
Flora of Bangladesh
Flora of China
Flora of Borneo
Flora of Cambodia
Flora of Laos
Flora of Malaysia
Flora of Myanmar
Flora of Nepal
Flora of New Guinea
Flora of Sri Lanka
Flora of Taiwan
Flora of Thailand
Flora of Tibet
Flora of Vietnam